In the 2011–12 season of Nationalliga A, the upper division of the Swiss Handball League, the championship was won by Kadetten SH of Schaffhausen, who defeated Wacker Thun in the final.

Team information

League table

Regular season

Championship Round

Semifinals

|}

Finals

|}

References

External links
 Scoresway

Handball leagues in Switzerland
2011–12 domestic handball leagues